John "Jay" Edward Town is an American attorney and former government official who served as the United States Attorney for the Northern District of Alabama from August 2017 to July 2020. Town had previously served as a senior prosecutor in the Madison County District Attorney's Office.

Education
Town received his Bachelor of Arts degree from the University of Notre Dame in 1995 and his Juris Doctor degree from Seton Hall University School of Law in 1998. Town was a Judge Advocate General in the United States Marine Corps, where he served on active duty and as a reservist for twelve years, achieving the rank of major.

Career 
From 2002 to 2005, Town served as an associate at McElroy, Deutsch, Mulvaney & Carpenter. From 2005 to 2017, he was a prosecutor in the Madison County District Attorney's Office. He also served on the executive committee of the Alabama Republican Party.

In June 2017, Town was announced as Donald Trump's nominee to become the United States Attorney for the Northern District of Alabama. He was confirmed to the position by the United States Senate on August 3, 2017. Town was sworn in as the U.S. Attorney for the Northern District of Alabama on August 11, 2017, by Chief District Judge Karon O. Bowdre. Town chaired or served on a number of committees during his tenure, including the China Initiative and the Presidential Commission on Law Enforcement and the Administration of Justice.

On July 10, 2020, Town announced he would resign as U.S. Attorney effective July 15, 2020. Town is now the Vice President and General Counsel at Gray Analytics, a military defense and cybersecurity contractor located in Huntsville, Alabama.

References

Living people
21st-century American lawyers
Alabama lawyers
Seton Hall University School of Law
United States Attorneys for the Northern District of Alabama
United States Marine Corps officers
University of Notre Dame alumni
United States Marine Corps Judge Advocate Division
Year of birth missing (living people)